Quezon City Jail is located in Quezon City northeast from Manila, Philippines, in the National Capital Region (NCR). It reports to the Bureau of Jail Management and Penology (BJMP). It was built for 800 inmates but with 3800 prisoners it is filled five times more than planned. In 2014, there was a riot with 42 people taken as hostages. In 2020, during COVID-19 pandemic, 9 inmates and 9 personnel were infected with COVID-19.

References 

Prisons in the Philippines